S road may refer to :
 Express roads in Poland
 in the USA :
 California county routes in zone S
 Corridor S, a road from Interstate 81 north of White Pine, Tennessee to Corridor F (State Route 63) in Harrogate